Arambašić is a Croatian and Serbian surname, derived from harambaša (bandit leader), which may refer to:

 Dragomir Arambašić (1881–1945), Serbian artist and sculptor
 Stanko Arambašić (1764–1798), officer who fought in the Austro-Turkish War (1788–1791)
 Zlatko Arambašić (born 1969) former Australian football player, now educator

See also
Harambašić

Croatian surnames
Serbian surnames